Ferdowsi Street formerly Alaodowleh Street is a street located in Tehran. It is named after Ferdowsi and is the center of Tehran’s currency exchange trade.

Features 

 Embassy of the United Kingdom

References

Streets in Tehran